EP2 is the second EP in a series of EPs released by American alternative rock band Pixies, released on January 3, 2014.

Composition and recording
Black Francis described his inspiration for the song "Blue Eyed Hexe":  "The song took on different forms, different music and different sets of lyrics. It went through a lot of changes before it settled where it is now. It's a tale from the northwest of the country and it's a witch-woman kind of a song. That's what a hexe is. And she's a blue-eyed hexe!"

Black Francis wrote "Greens and Blues" with the intention of creating "a better 'Gigantic'" – something that would "musically, emotionally and psychologically – sit in the same place that Gigantic has sat" and serve as a "show-closer."

Critical reception

Like EP1, EP2 received mostly negative reviews and was sometimes compared unfavorably to the band's earlier work. In a 2.0/10 review for Pitchfork, Jayson Greene described the two EPs as "an increasingly mournful asterisk affixed to a beloved legacy". Greene gave modest praise to "Magdalena" which he wrote "sounds, passingly, like a lesser track from Bossanova or Teenager of the Year", but panned "Blue Eyed Hexe", writing "[Black Francis] screams like a Brian Johnson imitator over a foursquare riff with no wit or play in it, the clonking woodblock hitting like a kid brother socking you repeatedly in the arm." John Dolan from Rolling Stone wrote that EP2 "feels like a faint echo of the band's later albums".

Mark Beaumont at NME gave the EP a positive review, writing that the four tracks "eschew any attempt to recreate the breathless brutalities of Doolittle or Surfer Rosa and instead move Pixies boldly on". Beaumont praised "Blue Eyed Hexe" for recreating "the menace of Pixies’ early work" and described "Greens and Blues" as "the most grab-at-the-sky Big Pop moment the new EPs have produced so far". Marc Burrows' review for Drowned in Sound was also generally positive, noting "what constitutes feeling their way back for the Pixies would be mightily impressive for a lesser band".

Track listing
"Blue Eyed Hexe" – 3:12
"Magdalena 318" – 3:25
"Greens and Blues" – 3:47
"Snakes" – 3:46

Personnel
Pixies
Black Francis – vocals, guitar
David Lovering – drums
Joey Santiago – guitar

Additional personnel
Ding (Simon "Ding" Archer) – bass guitar 
Gil Norton – production
Vaughan Oliver – artwork

References

External links
 Official music videos:
 Blue Eyed Hexe
 Magdalena
 Greens and Blues
 Snakes

Pixies (band) EPs
2014 EPs
Self-released EPs